Bazhino is a rural locality (a village) in Kuprosskoye Rural Settlement, Yusvinsky District, Perm Krai, Russia. The population was 8 as of 2010. There are 4 streets.

Geography 
Bazhino is located 12 km east of Yusva (the district's administrative centre) by road. Tarakanovo is the nearest rural locality.

References 

Rural localities in Yusvinsky District